D. rosae  may refer to:
 Diplocarpon rosae, a fungus species that causes the disease Black Spot on roses
 Diplolepis rosae, a gall wasp species

See also
 Rosae